Min Hti (Arakanese and Burmese: မင်းထီး;  – ; Minhti or Mindi) was king of Launggyet Arakan from  to 1373/74. He is best known for being the longest reigning monarch in history.

He became the king at a young age after his father Min Bilu was assassinated by Sithabin I. According to the Arakanese chronicles, he reigned for 106 years while one British colonial era scholar estimated it to be about 95 years. At any rate, the 95-year-reign is recognized by the Guinness Book of World Records as the longest "reputed" reign.

Popular Tales 

Legend of King Min Hti, known for his stern justice, had a new palace erected. As his betel-chewing subjects are in the habit of cleaning, after removing lime from the box and laying it on the betel-leaf, their soiled forefingers on the door posts of his new palace were not to be soiled in this manner; any one infringing the rule was to have the offending finger cut off. After some time the king, forgetful of his own order, cleaned his finger on one of the palace door posts. One of the ministers made a careful note of it, writing down the date and hour when it occurred but did not remove the lime from the post. A few days later the king observed the spot on the palace door and angrily ordered his ministers to ascertain the offender and see the punishment for such an offense inflicted upon him. When the ministers produced the proof of his own guilt, the king, with his own sword, cut off his forefinger, saying 'that even a king should not issue orders for himself to break with impunity'. To commemorate the event he had the image house erected, and instructed the sculptors to allow only tour fingers to the rights hand of the images of Buddha.

Early life 

Young King was born to King Min Bilu and Queen Saw and while seeing the high proposed destinies of his son, he ordered him to be cast into the Lemro River and luckily was saved by the fishermen, was sent to remote part of the Kingdom, hidden in the Yoe Chaung village on the Urittaung Mountains which is modern day Ponnagyun Township, Rakhine State where he grew up until he ascends the throne.

Reign 

Min Hti ascended to the throne by acclemation of his father's legacy in 641 ME (1279 AD), after usurper Sithabin I was deposed and executed by the ministers. Young King was sitting on his uncle's lap as his royal advisor.

In the year 656 ME (1294 AD), Shans invaded the Kingdom but were repulsed. Thuratan of Bengal send presents of elephants and horses. After this his dominions again being attacked by various quarters by the Shans, the Talaing, the Burmese, and the Thet tribe in the north, the king went to Mahamuni Temple, and, depositing his rosary before the idol, vowed to rid of the country of its enemies. In pursuance of this vow, he marched in person to repel the Talaings who had possessed themselves of the country south town of Sandoway. His uncle, Uza-na-gyi was sent with the army to attack Pagan. Salingathu, his brother in-law advanced into Pegu, and the general, Raza-thin-gyan was sent against the Thet tribe. The City of Pagan was taken, the Talaings were overrawed and the expedition against the Thet, after being once repulsed, was eventually crowned with success. After this the general, Razathingyan subdued the country along the sea coast as far as the Brahmaputra River. 

In the year 689 ME (1327 AD), the Pinya Kingdom made an attack upon the Ramree Island, and carried away number of inhabitants who were planted upon the Manipur frontier, followed by the Shans, who appeared on the Lemro River in 1334.
In retaliation, King ordered his Army to cross the Arakan Mountain to raid and annexed Thayet, and captured Governor Min Shin Saw of Thayet and carried off his entire family to Launggyet. 

On his way back from the campaign, he founded the small town of Ann  lying below the Rakhine Yoma in 1334/1335. The location served as passage cross the Arakan Mountains reaching Minbu.
 
After in his final years, Viceroy of Thandwe having gained possession of relic of Gotama brought from Ceylon, by virtue of which expected to obtain sovereignty, rose in rebellion, but was finally reduced to obidience. Soon After this, King Min Hti died after reign of 106 years and having died without legitimate heir to the throne falls into hands of Launggyet Court. The kingdom fell into interregnum. After while, his eldest son succeeded him.

Administration 
Min Hti's ruling administration is remembered as being particularly philosophical. During the early years of his reign as he was too young to make important political decisions, most were made by his mother or uncle and a court of minor regents. An example of Min Hti's beliefs can be seen in his decrees. In one he is quoted as writing "If a son is to act out, his father should be investigated, if the daughter is to act out, her mother should be, if a wife is acting out, her husband, and if a student is acting out, their teacher should be judged." This type of philosophy was the defining characteristic of Min Hti's rule: he believed environmental factors contributed to the actions of others, and should not be disregarded when considering culpability.

Family tree 

The King had four consorts and three sons who later succeeded him. Origin of Mrauk U Royal Family can traced its bloodline from King Min Hti. The King's son Thinhse had two sons whose names were Razathu II, who was the father of the founder of Mrauk U, Min Saw Mon.

Historiography
The Arakanese chronicles, Rakhine Razawin Haung, Dhanyawaddy Ayedawbon and Rakhine Razawin Thit, all say that he reigned for 106 years although the Dhanyawaddy Ayedawbon contains inconsistent reporting. The British colonial period scholars adapted the reign to 1279 to 1385 and 1279 to 1374.

Notes

References

Bibliography

 
 
 
 
 
 
 
 

Monarchs of Mrauk-U
13th-century Burmese monarchs
14th-century Burmese monarchs
1270s births
1370s deaths
Monarchs of Launggyet